Yoshino Nakashima (born 27 July 1999) is a Japanese professional footballer who plays as a forward for WE League club Sanfrecce Hiroshima Regina.

Club career 
Nakashima made her WE League debut on 12 September 2021.

References 

Living people
1999 births
Japanese women's footballers
Women's association football forwards
Association football people from Kumamoto Prefecture
Sanfrecce Hiroshima Regina players
WE League players